Bornabad may refer to:
 Bornabad, Lorestan
 Shahrak-e Bornabad, Lorestan Province
 Bornabad, Bardaskan, Razavi Khorasan Province